Khombole is a town in the Thiès Region of Senegal. It is in the Thiès Department. The population in 2012 was 12,880, an increase from the 11,574 counted in 2002.

Pape Mandialbere Mboup was elected mayor in 2014.

Notable residents
Ousmane Socé Diop, veterinarian and politician
Seydou Nourou Ba, ambassador
Ousmane Mbaye, politician

References

Populated places in Thiès Region
Communes of Senegal